Finnøya is an island in Ålesund Municipality in Møre og Romsdal county, Norway. The  island of Finnøya is connected by a causeway to the neighboring island of Harøya, and it has ferry connections to Sandøya and Orta.

See also
List of islands of Norway

References

Ålesund
Islands of Møre og Romsdal